SM UB-114 was a German Type UB III submarine or U-boat in the German Imperial Navy during World War I. She was commissioned into the German Imperial Navy on 4 May 1918 as SM UB-114.

UB-114 was lost in trials on 13 May 1918 in Kiel harbour, resulting in seven dead and re-entered service. She as surrendered to the Allies at Harwich on 21 November 1918 in accordance with the requirements of the Armistice with Germany, but was lost in tow to a French port in early 1919. The wreck was identified by archaeologist Innes McCartney in 2013.

Construction

She was built by Blohm & Voss of Hamburg and following just under a year of construction, launched at Hamburg on 23 September 1917. UB-114 was commissioned in the spring the next year under the command of Oblt.z.S. Ernst Berlin. Like all Type UB III submarines, UB-114 carried 10 torpedoes and was armed with a  deck gun. UB-114 had a displacement of  while surfaced and  when submerged. Her engines enabled her to travel at  when surfaced and  when submerged.

References

Notes

Bibliography 

 

German Type UB III submarines
World War I submarines of Germany
U-boats commissioned in 1918
1917 ships
Ships built in Hamburg
U-boats sunk in 1918
Maritime incidents in 1918